24-Rishikesh Legislative Assembly constituency is one of the seventy electoral Uttarakhand Legislative Assembly constituencies of Uttarakhand state in India.

Rishikesh Legislative Assembly constituency, currently is a part of Haridwar (Lok Sabha constituency) as per the delimitation in 2008. Prior to the delimitation in 2008, it was a part of Tehri Garhwal (Lok Sabha constituency).

Members of Legislative Assembly

Election results

2022

See also
 Rishikesh

References

External link
  
http://eci.nic.in/eci_main/CurrentElections/CONSOLIDATED_ORDER%20_ECI%20.pdf. The Election Commission of India. p. 509.
http://ceo.uk.gov.in/files/Election2012/RESULTS_2012_Uttarakhand_State.pdf
https://web.archive.org/web/20081203060201/http://gov.ua.nic.in/ceouttranchal/ceo/ac_pc.aspx
https://web.archive.org/web/20081203060144/http://gov.ua.nic.in/ceouttranchal/ceo/ac_detl.aspx

Rishikesh
Assembly constituencies of Uttarakhand